{{Infobox person
| name               = Shashank Vyas
| image              = ShashankVyas.jpg
| caption            = 
| birth_place        = Ujjain, Madhya Pradesh, India
| nationality        = Indian
| occupation         = 
| height             = 185 cm
| spouse             = 
| children           = 
| parents            = Vikas. K. Vyas (Father)Geeta Vyas (Mother)
| known for          = Balika VadhuRoop - Mard Ka Naya SwaroopJaana Na Dil Se Door
| years_active       = 2010–present
| birth_date         = 
}}

Shashank Vyas (born 30 November 1986) is an Indian actor and model known for playing Dr. Jagdish 'Jagya' Singh in Balika Vadhu, Captain Ravish Vashisht in Jaana Na Dil Se Door and Roop in Roop - Mard Ka Naya Swaroop.

Early life

Shashank Vyas was born on 30 November 1986 to Vikas and Geeta Vyas in a Pushkarna Brahman family in Ujjain, Madhya Pradesh. He graduated from Maharaja Ranjit Singh College, Indore and started studying for MBA entrance exams. Later he pursued his acting career upon the encouragement of a friend.

Career
Vyas made his debut in 2010 with the role of Jagdish "Jagya" Singh in Colors TV's Balika Vadhu. In 2016, he played Captain Ravish Vashisht in Star Plus's Jaana Na Dil Se Door. From 2018 to 2019, he portrayed Roopendra "Roop" Singh Vaghela in Colors TV's Roop - Mard Ka Naya Swaroop''.

He also appeared in a short flim titled 'Ek Mulaqat' in July 2019, where he played character Avi Malhotra opposite Adaa Khan.

Media Image
Vyas was featured in the Top Sexiest Asian Men 2017 list released by London-based magazine Eastern Eye. In 2018, he was listed 14th in The times of India 20 Most Desirable Men of TV. He was also featured in Top Most Desirable Men of Indian Television 2020 list.

Filmography

Films

Television

Special Appearances

Awards and nominations

References

External links 

 Shashank Vyas on Instagram 
 
1986 births 
Indian male television actors 
Male actors in Hindi cinema 
21st-century Indian male actors 
Male actors from Madhya Pradesh 
Indian male soap opera actors 
Living people 
People from Ujjain